Cristina Hechavarria (also known as Cristina Echevarria) was a Cuban sprinter. She won the gold medal in the 4 × 100 metres relay at the 1967 Pan American Games, and the silver medal in the 100 metres at the 1966 Central American and Caribbean Games. She was the grandmother and first coach of 2016 Olympic silver-medalist Orlando Ortega. She died when Ortega was young, and in her remembrance Ortega kept all his medals at her house.

Her husband Orlando Ortega Sr. was a member of the Cuba national football team in the 1960s.

References

Cuban female sprinters
Pan American Games medalists in athletics (track and field)
Pan American Games gold medalists for Cuba
Athletes (track and field) at the 1967 Pan American Games
Central American and Caribbean Games medalists in athletics
Central American and Caribbean Games silver medalists for Cuba
Competitors at the 1966 Central American and Caribbean Games
Medalists at the 1967 Pan American Games
20th-century Cuban women